Abraliopsis chuni is a species of enoploteuthid cephalopod known from Indo-Pacific waters. Very little is known of this species.

References

Abraliopsis
Molluscs described in 1982